Bastian Kersaudy (born 9 June 1994) is a French badminton player from the Chambly Oise club. He has won some international tournament includes, the 2014 Brazil International in the men's doubles event partnered with Gaetan Mittelheisser, the 2015 Slovenia International in the mixed doubles event partnered with Léa Palermo, and at the 2017 Estonian International tournament in the men's doubles event partnered with Julien Maio.

Kersaudy competed at the 2015 European Games in Baku, Azerbaijan. In 2018, he captured the men's doubles gold medal at the 2018 Mediterranean Games partnered with Thom Gicquel.

Achievements

Mediterranean Games 
Men's doubles

BWF International Challenge/Series (3 titles, 8 runners-up) 
Men's doubles

Mixed doubles

  BWF International Challenge tournament
  BWF International Series tournament
  BWF Future Series tournament

References

External links 
 
 

1994 births
Living people
Sportspeople from Rennes
French male badminton players
Badminton players at the 2015 European Games
European Games competitors for France
Mediterranean Games gold medalists for France
Competitors at the 2018 Mediterranean Games
Mediterranean Games medalists in badminton
21st-century French people